Fairmont Singapore (Chinese: 费尔蒙特酒店), formerly Raffles The Plaza (Chinese: 莱佛士大厦) is the sister hotel of Swissôtel The Stamford located within the Raffles City complex in Singapore. It has a total of 778 rooms and suites housed within two 26-storey towers. Opened as The Westin Plaza in 1986, the hotel was refurbished together with Swissôtel The Stamford, formerly known as the Westin Stamford, and was renamed Raffles The Plaza on 1 January 2002 and Fairmont Singapore on 12 December 2007 with a change in branding. In September 2019, Fairmont Singapore completed its renovation of the South Tower.

Both hotels are currently managed by Fairmont Raffles Hotels International. Fairmont Singapore currently houses one of Asia's largest spas - Willow Stream, formerly RafflesAmrita Spa, and shares all sports and recreation facilities with Swissôtel The Stamford. The hotel is connected to Swissôtel The Stamford, Raffles City Convention Centre, Raffles City, City Hall MRT station, and CityLink Mall.

In 2005, the 117th IOC Session was held in the Raffles City Convention Centre, located in Raffles City. Most IOC members stayed in this hotel, as did several well-known figures who came to the city to support their cities' bids. In 2006, the hotel's service area in the basement became an expanded retail area of Raffles City with 50 new shops.

Restaurants at the Raffles City hotels
The food, beverage and spa outlets at both Fairmont Singapore and Swissôtel The Stamford are operated by the same management.

 Fairmont Singapore
 The Eight
 Anti:dote
 Asian Market Cafe
 Mikuni
 Prego 
 The House of Wei
 Swissôtel The Stamford
 CLOVE (formerly Cafe Swiss)
 JAAN by Kirk Westaway
 Kopi Tiam
 SKAI 
 SKAI Bar
 The Stamford Brasserie
 Bar Rouge Singapore

Raffles City Convention Centre
Raffles City Convention Centre (RCCC) has more than 108,000 square feet of function space, including 27 meeting rooms and 3 ballrooms. It is located in the same building as Fairmont Singapore and is managed by the hotel.

Aquaponics Farm
Together with Swissotel The Stamford, Fairmont Singapore set up a 450 sq m rooftop aquaponics farm in 2019 where fish and plants are grown together in a closed system. The farm is expected to grow 30% of all vegetables required across the 2 hotels.

Awards
Some of the accolades Fairmont Singapore has received include:

 Singapore's Leading Conference Hotel 2019 (World Travel Awards 2019)
 Awarded the Friend of the Arts award (The Patron of the Arts 2019 Awards)
 Top 5 City Hotels in Singapore (Travel + Leisure's World's Best Awards 2019)
 Singapore's Leading Conference Hotel (World Travel Awards 2018)
 Top 25 Hotels in Singapore (TripAdvisor's Travellers' Choice Awards 2019, 2018, 2017, 2016)
 Four-Star Rating (FORBES Travel Guide 2018, 2015, 2014)
 Best Wedding Venue (Singapore Tatler's Best of Singapore 2017)
 BCA Green Mark Award 2017 (Gold) for Raffles City Convention Centre
 Certificate of Excellence Hall of Fame (Five-Time Winner, TripAdvisor 2015)
 Best in Stay Award (Orbitz Worldwide 2015)
 Top 10 Hotels in Singapore (Condé Nast Travellers Reader's Choice Award 2015)

References

External links

 Fairmont Singapore

Downtown Core (Singapore)
Skyscraper hotels in Singapore
Hotel buildings completed in 1985
Singapore
1986 establishments in Singapore
Retail buildings in Singapore
20th-century architecture in Singapore